Danbury Independent School District is a public school district based in Danbury, Texas (USA).

The High School's mascot is the Panther.

In 2010, the school district was rated "recognized" by the Texas Education Agency.

Schools
Danbury High School (Grades 9-12)
Danbury Middle School (Grades 6-8)
Danbury Elementary School (Grades PK-5)

References

External links

School districts in Brazoria County, Texas